Leutnant Leopold Anslinger was a German World War I flying ace credited with ten aerial victories while flying on the Russian Front.

Early life

Leopold Anslinger was born on 13 August 1891 in Freiberg, Germany.

World War I service

Anslinger learned to fly pre-World War I, earning pilot certificate No. 566 on 14 October 1913. When the war began, he was a corporal pilot. Promoted to Feldwebel, he was posted to Flieger-Abteilung 54 (Flier Detachment 54) on the Russian Front. He was commissioned on 22 March 1915. He won the Iron Cross Second Class on 17 April 1915 and the First Class on 18 August. On 5 December 1915, he was awarded the Military Merit Cross.  Between 18 January and 28 August 1916, he scored his first four victories, three of them over French pilots. He also received further honors, beginning with the February 1916 award of the Austro-Hungarian Military Merit Cross and Baden Ritterkreuz, followed by the Royal House Order of Hohenzollern and the Austro-Hungarian Iron Cross.

Anslinger was transferred to Flieger-Abteilung 24/242 (Flier Detachment 24/242) and teamed with Wilhelm Frickart as his gunner. Together, they scored six wins between 12 April and 30 June 1917. Anslinger was then transferred to Kampfeinsitzerstaffel 9 (Combat Single-Seater Squadron 9) in Mainz on homeland defense duties.

Post World War I

Leopold Anslinger was a pilot for Lufthansa. He died on 18 June 1978.

Notes

References
Above the Lines: The Aces and Fighter Units of the German Air Service, Naval Air Service and Flanders Marine Corps 1914 - 1918 Norman L. R. Franks, et al. Grub Street, 1993. , .

1891 births
1978 deaths
Luftstreitkräfte officers
German World War I flying aces
Military personnel from Freiburg im Breisgau
People from the Grand Duchy of Baden
Lufthansa people
Recipients of the Iron Cross (1914), 1st class